Thomas Seltzer may refer to:

 Thomas Seltzer (translator) (1875–1943), translator and editor of Russian stories
 Thomas Seltzer (musician) (born 1969), also known as Happy-Tom, Norwegian musician, television personality and author.